AF4 may refer to:
 AF4/FMR2 family member 1, a human protein
 Asymmetric flow field flow fractionation, a method for polymer characterization
 AF4: an EEG electrode site according to the 10-20 system